Livingstone High School is a school in the Western Cape of South Africa. It was founded by Abdullah Abdurahman in 1926. As of August 2017 Theodore Bruinders was the school's principal, currently the Acting Principal is Mr D.R. Niekerk. Ashley van de Horn is currently the deputy principal.The principal who has been serving the school was Mr Najaar before he had retired. In 2021 the current acting principal is Mrs. Ganie

Notable alumni 
 Geraldine Fraser-Moleketi, a South African politician who was Minister for the Public Service and Administration.
 Neal Petersen, world-class professional solo racing yachtsman, global investor, award-winning author of Journey of a Hope Merchant, and the subject of a PBS documentary.
 Ebrahim Rasool, politician and diplomat, Premier of the Western Cape (2004 - 2008)

References

External links
 

Schools in Cape Town
Educational institutions established in 1926
1926 establishments in South Africa